Protected areas of Hungary includes 10 national parks, 35 landscape protection areas and 145 minor nature reserves. The national policy for governing and management of the protected areas is implemented by the Minister of Agriculture (State Secretary for the Environment). The first national park in Hungary at the Great Hungarian Plain is Hortobágy National Park, established in 1973.

Types of protected areas:
National Park (abbr. NP)
Protected Landscape Area (abbr. TK)
National Nature Reserve or nature conservation area (abbr. TT)

National Parks 

There are 10 national parks in Hungary (IUCN Category II) as of 2014.

Protected Landscape Area 
Hungary has 35 Landscape Protection Areas in Hungary (IUCN Category V) as of 2014.

National Nature Reserve 

Aggtelek NP (5):
 Abaújkéri Sóstói-legelő TT
 Edelényi Nőszirmos TT
 Keleméri Mohos-tavak TT
 Long-erdő TT
 Rudabányai Őshominoidea Lelőhely TT
Balaton Uplands NP (27):
 Atyai-láprét TT
 Bakonygyepesi Zergebogláros TT
 Balatonfüredi-erdő TT
 Balatonkenesei Tátorjános TT
 Darvas-tói Lefejtett Bauxitlencse TT
 Devecseri Széki-erdő TT
 Farkasgyepűi kísérleti erdő TT
 Fenyőfői ősfenyves TT
 Hévízi-tó TT
 Hódoséri ciklámenes TT
 Keszthelyi Kastélypark TT
 Látrány-puszta TT
 Nagybereki Fehérvíz TT
 Nyirádi Sár-álló TT
 Sárosfői Halastavak TT
 Somlóvásárhelyi Holt-tó TT
 Somogyvári Kupavár-hegy TT
 Sümegi Fehér kövek TT és erdőrezervátum
 Sümegi Mogyorós-domb TT
 Szentgáli Tiszafás TT
 Tapolcafői Láprét TT
 Tapolcai-Tavasbarlang felszíne
 Úrkúti-Őskarszt TT
 Uzsai Csarabos TT
 Várpalotai Homokbánya TT
 Zalakomári Madárrezervátum TT
 Zirc Arboretum TT

References

External links
National Parks of Hungary at magyarnemzetiparkok.hu
Official Nature Conservation in Hungary at termeszetvedelem.hu